Juniperus scopulorum, the Rocky Mountain juniper, is a species of juniper native to western North America, from southwest Canada to the Great Plains of the United States.

Description
The shoots are slender,  diameter. The leaves are arranged in opposite decussate pairs, or occasionally in whorls of three; the adult leaves are scale-like, 1–3 mm long (to 5 mm on lead shoots) and  broad. The juvenile leaves (on young seedlings only) are needle-like, 5–10 mm long. The seed cones are berry-like, globose to bilobed,  in diameter, dark blue with a pale blue-white waxy bloom, and contain two seeds (rarely one or three); they are mature in about 18 months and are eaten by wildlife. It is dioecious, producing cones of only one sex on each tree. Rocky Mountain juniper is an aromatic plant. Essential oil extracted from the trunk is prominent in cis-thujopsene, α-pinene, cedrol, allo-aromadendrene epoxide, (E)-caryophyllene, and widdrol. Limb essential oil is primarily α-pinene and leaf essential oil is primarily sabinene. 

One particular individual, the Jardine Juniper in Utah, is thought to be over 1,500 years old, while a dead trunk found in New Mexico was found to have 1,888 rings; older trees in the same area are suspected to exceed 2,000 years.

Similar species 
Juniperus scopulorum is closely related to J. virginiana, and often hybridizes with it where their ranges meet on the Great Plains. Hybrids with J. horizontalis also occur.

Isolated populations of junipers occur close to sea level in the Puget Sound area in Washington Park near Anacortes and southwestern British Columbia in a park called Smugglers Cove. In both locales, there are a considerable number of young and old specimens. Previously included in J. scopulorum, it has recently been shown to be genetically distinct, and has been described as a new species J. maritima. It is a cryptic species barely distinguishable on morphology, though it does differ in phenology, with the cones maturing in 14–16 months, and often has the tips of the seeds exposed at the cone apex.

Taxonomy 
Scopulorum means "of the mountains".

Distribution and habitat 
The species is native to western North America, in Canada in south British Columbia and southwest Alberta, in the United States sporadically from Washington east to North Dakota, south to Arizona and also locally western Texas, and northernmost Mexico from Sonora east to Coahuila.

Ecology
The Bohemian waxwing eats the berries. According to one study, a single bird consumed 900 in five hours.

Uses 
Some Plateau Indian tribes boiled an infusion from the leaves and inner bark to treat coughs and fevers. The cones were also sometimes boiled into a drink used as a laxative and to treat colds. Among many Native American cultures, the smoke of the burning juniper is used to drive away evil spirits prior to conducting a ceremony, such as a healing ceremony.

A small quantity of ripe berries can be eaten as an emergency food or as a sage-like seasoning for meat. The dried berries can be roasted and ground into a coffee substitute. The tree is sometimes planted as a windbreak and horticulturally in rocky, poorly irrigated soils.

The cultivar 'Skyrocket' is a very popular ornamental plant in gardens, grown for its very slender, strictly erect growth habit. Due to its disposition for a fungal disease, namely cedar apple rust, caused by Gymnosporangium juniperi-virginianae, 'Skyrocket' is more and more replaced by the new cultivar J. virginiana 'Blue Arrow'. 'Blue Arrow' is a recipient of the Royal Horticultural Society's Award of Garden Merit. Several other cultivars are also grown to a lesser extent. It is also a popular collected tree for bonsai in the U.S.

See also
Ecology of the Rocky Mountains
Jardine Juniper
Pinyon-juniper woodland

References

scopulorum
Flora of the Rocky Mountains
Trees of the Great Basin
Trees of the Western United States
Trees of the Northwestern United States
Trees of the Southwestern United States
Trees of Alberta
Trees of British Columbia
Plants used in traditional Native American medicine
Least concern plants
Flora of North America
Dioecious plants